The Fort William Mountain Festival is an annual festival of mountain culture held in Fort William, Scotland.

References

External links
Official website

Climbing in Scotland
Film festivals in Scotland
Mountaineering festivals
Fort William, Highland
Sports festivals in Scotland